Ascher's syndrome, is a rare disorder first described in 1920.  It is characterized by repeated episodes of lip and eyelid edema and occasionally euthyroid goiter.  The syndrome generally occurs within the first 20 years of life.   About 100 cases had been described by 1998.

Signs and Symptoms
 Blepharochalasis : Recurrent episodes of swelling cause stretching and atrophy of the upper eyelid skin.  This results in the relaxation of the tarsal fold allowing tissue to slack over the palpebral fissure.  In severe cases, the lower eyelid is also involved.
 Double Upper Lip : Swelling causes duplication between the inner and outer parts of the upper lip.  Occasionally the lower lip is involved.
 Euthyroid Goiter : Occurs in 10% of cases.  It is not usually associated with toxic symptoms.  Goiter usually presents several years after initial eyelid and lip edema.

Diagnosis

Treatment
Cosmetic surgery is generally the treatment of choice.

References

External links 

Syndromes affecting the eye
Syndromes affecting the endocrine system